A bowl is a typically round dish or container generally used for preparing, serving, or consuming food. The interior of a bowl is characteristically shaped like a spherical cap, with the edges and the bottom forming a seamless curve. This makes bowls especially suited for holding liquids and loose food, as the contents of the bowl are naturally concentrated in its center by the force of gravity. The exterior of a bowl is most often round, but can be of any shape, including rectangular.

The size of bowls varies from small bowls used to hold a single serving of food to large bowls, such as punch bowls or salad bowls, that are often used to hold or store more than one portion of food. There is some overlap between bowls, cups, and plates. Very small bowls, such as the tea bowl, are often called cups, while plates with especially deep wells are often called bowls.

In many cultures, bowls are the most common kind of vessel used for serving and eating food. Historically, small bowls were also used for serving both tea and alcoholic drinks. In Western culture plates and cups are more commonly used.

Background

Modern bowls can be made of ceramic, metal, wood, plastic, and other materials. Bowls have been made for thousands of years. Very early bowls have been found in China, Ancient Greece, Crete and in certain Native American cultures.

In Ancient Greek pottery, small bowls, including phiales and pateras, and bowl-shaped cups called kylices were used.  Phiales were used for libations and included a small dent in the center for the bowl to be held with a finger, although one source indicates that these were used to hold perfume rather than wine. Some Mediterranean examples from the Bronze Age manifest elaborate decoration and sophistication of design. For example, the bridge spouted vessel design appeared at the Minoan site of Phaistos. In the 4th millennium BC, evidence exists that the Uruk culture of ancient Mesopotamia mass-produced beveled rim bowls of standardized sizes. Moreover, in Chinese pottery, there are many elaborately painted bowls and other vessels dating to the Neolithic period. , the oldest bowl found is 18,000 years old.

In examining bowls found during an archaeological dig in North America, the anthropologist Vincas Steponaitis defines a bowl by its dimensions, writing that a bowl's diameter rarely falls under half its height and that historic bowls can be classified by their edge, or lip, and shape.

Communal bowl 

In many cultures, food and drink are shared in a communal bowl or cup.  In Mali, the name of the town of Bandiagara refers to the communal bowl meals are served in. The name translates roughly to "large eating bowl." In Zimbabwe, sadza is traditionally eaten from a communal bowl, a tradition that is still maintained by some families, mainly in rural areas. It is generally eaten with the right hand without the aid of cutlery and often rolled into a ball before being dipped into a variety of condiments such as sauce/gravy, sour milk, or stewed vegetables. Lakh is a popular boiled porridge made with rolled millet flour pellets (araw/arraw) typically topped at serving with sweetened fermented milk. It is usually served in a communal bowl or platter in Senegal.

In China, it is considered rude and unhygienic for a diner to use his or her own chopsticks to pick up food from communal bowls and plates when such utensils are present. Other potentially rude behaviors with chopsticks include playing with them, separating them in any way (such as holding one in each hand), piercing food with them, or standing them vertically in a plate of food. (The latter is especially rude, evoking images of incense or joss sticks used ceremoniously at funerals.)

In some cultures, the communal bowl has a set of social strictures, as evidenced by the Spanish idiom, "¿Cuándo hemos comido en el mismo plato?" (English: When have we eaten from the same dish?).

Gallery

See also
 Bridge spouted vessel
 Buffet
 Dishware
 List of eating utensils

Notes

References

External links

 
 

Containers
Crockery
Kitchenware
Serving vessels